Rory Girvan is a British actor, best known for playing Sunil in Stella, Sky Comedy Drama written by and starring Ruth Jones.

Career

Rory trained with the National Youth Theatre and performed in their production of  Outright Terror Bold and Brilliant directed by former National Youth Theatre Artistic Director John Hoggarth and written by Dan Rebellato, at the Soho Theatre.

Other theatre credits include Tits/Teeth at the Soho Theatre, Herons at the Library Theatre  and A Girl in a Car With a Man at the Contact Theatre.

In 2008 Rory made his film debut in Ticket, a crime drama about toxic masculinity written and directed by Bizhan Tong , and in 2011 he was cast as Sunil in Stella, Sky Comedy Drama written by and starring Ruth Jones. The second series aired on Sky One in January 2013.

Additional screen credits include BBC Comedy's Bluestone 42, Kay Mellor's The Syndicate on BBC 1 and Wayne in the film adaptation of Daniel Clay's novel Broken, directed by Rufus Norris. 
He also appeared in the hit series of Sally Wainwright's Happy Valley in 2014 on BBC 1.

References

Living people
English male television actors
English male film actors
English male stage actors
National Youth Theatre members
Year of birth missing (living people)